Goseong (Goseong-gun ) is a county in Gangwon Province, South Korea.

Prior to the 1953 Armistice which ceased the Korean War, Goseong (which is located north of the 38th parallel) was a part of North Korea. Kaesong, which is south of the 38th parallel and a part of South Korea before 1953, became part of the North after the Armistice.

Climate

Festival 
The Goseong Lavender Festival is held every June. The lavender festival has a concert, a trial performance of lavender perfume, and a variety of lavender classes. In addition, there are programs that can be enjoyed by anyone from children to the elderly, such as lavender pizza making, children's drawing contest, and poetry making.

2019 fire

On April 4, 2019, high winds led to a high-voltage power line owned by Korea Electric Power Corporation to fall causing an electric arc. The fire spread to the cities of Sokcho, Inje, Donghae and Gangneung leading to two deaths, over 30 injuries and the evacuation of over 4,000 residents. The fire burned 1,307 acres (5.3 km2), damaged over 200 homes, over 2000 buildings causing an estimated damages of 5.2 billion Korean Won ($4.6 million). More than 13,000 firefighters were mobilized from throughout the Korean peninsula to fight the fire. By April 6, the fire was extinguished with firefighters checking for potential hot spots. They finally extinguished the fire on April 6-7

Sister cities
 Gangbuk-gu, Seoul
 Jixi, Heilongjiang, China

See also
 Kosong county (Kangwon province, North Korea)

References

External links
County government home page

 
Counties of Gangwon Province, South Korea
Biosphere reserves of South Korea